Fish head refers to the head of a fish in popular culture and its use as a seafood.

Fish head may also refer to:
 Fish head (anatomy), the anatomy of a fish head
 Fish's Head, a 1989 new wave album of songs by John Watts
 Fish Heads (song), a 1978 novelty song by Barnes & Barnes about things fish heads can and cannot do
 Head of the Fish, a rowing race hosted by the Saratoga Rowing Association in New York State
 Slang for anyone in a Royal Navy uniform.

Not to be confused with headfish, which is a common name for a species of anglerfish 

Writer Irvin S. Cobb's acclaimed 1913 short horror story, was entitled "Fishhead."

Fans of Phish are known as Phishheads.